The Last Samurai is a 2003 film.

The Last Samurai may also refer to:

 The Last Samurai (1974 film)
 Mifune: The Last Samurai, a 2015 documentary
 Oba: The Last Samurai, 2011 drama
 The Last Samurai (novel)
 "The Last Samurai", the first episode of Knife or Death
 Saigō Takamori, dubbed "the last true samurai"